Rodrigo Arango Velásquez (March 4, 1925 – December 27, 2008) was the second Catholic Bishop of the Diocese of Buga, Colombia. He was the first Colombian Bishop of the Sulpician order.

Born in Betania, Colombia, he was ordain to the priesthood on June 3, 1950. On January 29, 1981, Pope John Paul II appointed him auxiliary bishop of the Roman Catholic Archdiocese of Medellín, Colombia and he was ordained a bishop on March 25, 1981. On January 17, 1985, Pope John Paul II appointed him Bishop of the Diocese of Buga. He retired on January 19, 2001.

Notes

1925 births
2008 deaths
20th-century Roman Catholic bishops in Colombia
Academic staff of the Major Seminary of Bogotá
Sulpician bishops
Roman Catholic bishops of Buga
Roman Catholic bishops of Medellín